Pitsilia is an agricultural region in Cyprus, with total area of , in a mountainous area of rocky land on very steep slopes that have been used mainly for grazing  goats and sheep and for producing small amounts of cereals, wine and grapes.

The region includes four of the biggest Church of Cyprus, which is registered in the list of World Heritage Sites by UNESCO. This is the church of the Transfiguration in the village Palaichori Oreinis the Cross of Agiasmati in Platanistasa, the Holy Cross in Pelentri and Lady Araka in Lagoudera.
Agricultural regions

History
Towards the end of the 4th century, Christianity adopted as obligatory religion in Roman Empire. In Cyprus some groups, exploiting these events, for personal benefits or revenge, started to use violence against those who did not agree to endorse Christianity. For this reason a large portion of the population, avoiding oppression forced to resettle in the highlands of Pitsilias.

The name also served as propaganda at the beginning of transition to Christianity. Since "Apistlia» was an offensive word, changed over time, to antonym Pitsilias.

In 653 AD due to the Arab invasion, the area of Pitsilias became the bastion of resistance, after strengthened by refugees and retreating soldiers. Mainly because of the small number (10000 Army), and after a few unsuccessful attempts, Rashidun Caliphate drafted peace treaty with local leaders of Pitsilias avoiding the ravages of guerrilla warfare

At 704AD a peace treaty between Umayyad Caliphate and Tiberios III was broken. Tiberios facilitated the repatriation of thousands of Cypriot war prisoners from Cyzicus Propontis. A large number of them settled in the region bringing the relics of the Holy Icons. Their freedom and repatriation was credited by them as a miracle through the Holy Icons' intercessions. After a few years later another miracle occurred - a general amnesty pardon for all fugitives, outlaws and militants in the area. The fame of the miracle Holy icons spread all over Cyprus and overseas. These facts led to the establishment of feasts and festivals to commemorate the Holy Icons. The thousands of pilgrims contribute to the economic growth of the region, an economic growth and stability that lasted over a period of four centuries.
The history of Pitsilia and the linkage between the past and the present is an example of the Hellenic elements survival in Cyprus. The festivals of Pitsilia have a special feature, combining the Christian devout and ancient Greek joyful celebrations. The song and music contest resembles the myth of Marsyas and Apollo.

See also
Cyprus in the Middle Ages

References

Sources
Ðáëáé÷þñéá (created by the unification of dorps that Moved)
Agros International
STRANGE HELLAS: Η μουσική στη μυθολογία και ο αλαζών Σειληνός Μαρσύας
Bible Gateway passage: 1 Timothy 3:15 - King James Version
Islam and Europe Timeline (355-1291 A.D.)  (688: Emperor Justinian II and Caliph al-Malik sign a peace treaty making  Cyprus neutral territory. For the next 300 years)
Greek blends

Further reading
George CIORAN   Χριστιανική Αρχαιολογική Εταιρεία (Christian Archaeological Society)
Κυπρος σταυροδρομι της Μεσογειου (Cyprus Crossroads of the Mediterranean)
Νεαρχος Κληριδης, Τοπωνυμια Κύπρος (Nearchos Clerides, Towns and States)

External links
Byzantine Empire 610-1095 by Sanderson Beck
A History of Cyprus

Geography of Cyprus